Kings Langley School is a coeducational secondary school and sixth form with academy status, located in the village of Kings Langley in Hertfordshire, England.

The school has pupils aged 11 to 18. Its traditional catchment area is between the nearby towns of Watford and Hemel Hempstead. Most students are from Kings Langley and around or in the neighbouring villages of Bovingdon, Abbots Langley, and Chipperfield.

The school became one of the first batch of schools to benefit from the governments PFI re-build scheme in 2012, and was completely re-built in September 2016.

The school was among the top 20 most improved secondary schools in England for GCSE results over the 2004–2007 period.

Notable former pupils
Anthony Joshua, London 2012 Olympics, Super Heavyweight Boxing Gold Medalist, Unified Heavyweight Champion of the World
Griff, Award-Winning Singer and Songwriter

References

External links 
 

Secondary schools in Hertfordshire
Academies in Hertfordshire
Dacorum
Educational institutions established in 2012
2012 establishments in England